Virginia Hill Wood (October 24, 1917 – March 8, 2013) was an American environmental activist and a pioneer in the Alaskan conservation movement. Ginny Wood co-founded the Alaska Conservation Society in 1960 with her then husband, Morton "Woody" Wood.

Biography

Aviator
Her first flight was at age 4, seated in her father's lap with a barnstorming pilot at the controls. While a student at the University of Washington, she enrolled in the Civilian Pilot Training Service and later the Women Airforce Service Pilots corps for flight instruction. During World War II she ferried military planes from Long Beach, California to locations throughout the United States.

After the war she flew cargo flights and war-surplus planes to Alaska and piloted tourist flights from Fairbanks to Kotzebue, Alaska.

Environmentalist
Wood became fond of outdoor activities such as hiking, fishing, river rafting and horseback riding while growing up in Oregon and Washington.

While in Fairbanks after the war she met and married Morton Wood, a forest ranger at Mount McKinley National Park. The Woods pooled their resources with Celia M. Hunter, who had served with Wood in the Women Airforce Service Pilots, to buy land in the Alaskan wilderness under the Homestead Act. In 1952 they began building Camp Denali on the property to serve as a tourist outpost and a base for backcountry exploration.

Wood was influenced by the writings of pioneer ecologist Aldo Leopold and his philosophy that the natural world and plants had intrinsic rights.

In the late 1950s, Wood hosted a meeting in her living room that led to formation of the Alaska Conservation Society. Wood helped lead protests against a plan to use nuclear explosives to create a deep-water harbor in northwest Alaska and she testified before Congress in opposition to the Rampart Dam. In 1960 she lobbied U.S. President Dwight D. Eisenhower to designate the Arctic National Wildlife Refuge.

Wood wrote a regular column for the Northern Alaska Environmental Center's newsletter. She guided her last back-country trip at age 70 and continued to cross-country ski into her 80s.

She died in her home in Fairbanks, Alaska, of natural causes.

References

1917 births
2013 deaths
American environmentalists
American women environmentalists
Aviators from Alaska
People from Denali Borough, Alaska
People from Fairbanks, Alaska
Place of birth missing
University of Washington alumni
Women Airforce Service Pilots personnel
21st-century American women